Solar New Year is the beginning of solar calendar year. The event is celebrated by numerous cultures in various ways at diverse dates. The 
most common bases chosen to begin a new calendar year are the winter solstice, summer solstice, the spring equinox and the autumnal equinox. South and South-east Asian solar calendars are more formally linked to astronomical events.

Some of the more widely known solar new year celebrations include:

Enkutatash (Ethiopian calendar): about ten days before the autumnal equinox
 January 1 in the Gregorian and Julian calendars (same number, different days): at present about twelve and twenty-five days respectively after the northern winter solstice.
Iranian New Year (Nowruz) : precisely the northern spring equinox
The various solar new years celebrated in South/SE Asia, whose new year is determined by the position of the Sun relative to the constellation of Aries, such as
Cambodian New Year: about six or seven days before the northern spring equinox
Tamil New Year (Puthandu): about 24 or 25 days after the northern spring equinox
Vaisakhi: about 24 or 25 days after the northern spring equinox
Pohela Boishakh (Bengali calendar): about 24 or 25 days after the northern spring equinox

See also
Lunar New Year
 Indian cultural sphere
Iranian cultural sphere
East Asian cultural sphere
New Year
New Year's Day

Notes

References

New Year celebrations